The Smile Foundation of Bali (Yayasan Senyum) is a non-profit organisation in Bali that helps people with craniofacial disabilities obtain health care.
Senyum means smile in Indonesian and yayasan means 'foundation' or 'institute'.

The Smile Foundation facilitates operations for cleft lip and palate and other craniofacial deformities, due to birth defects, accidents, or tumours. The organisation helps poor people from Bali, Lombok and further east, and raises funds for operations whether in Bali or Adelaide, Australia at the Australian Craniofacial Unit. Yayasan Senyum received a generous grant of US$2,500 from The Smile Train to enable the foundation to advertise the fact that cleft conditions can be treated and that it is able to assist people to get that treatment.

History 

The Smile Foundation of Bali was founded in 2005 by Mary Northmore-Aziz at the suggestion of Dr. David David from the Australian Craniofacial Unit, to identify those in need of craniofacial surgery. Dr. David David has continued his association as the chief adviser to the foundation. In December 2006 the foundation opened the "Smile Shop", which was the first Op shop in Bali. It provides a source of income for the foundation through the sale of secondhand goods and old stock from local businesses.

After extensive fundraising, the "Smile House" was opened in January, 2007, in Denpasar. The Smile House provides accommodation and educational facilities, in particular for those from outlying areas.

Background 

In many countries, craniofacial disabilities are treated shortly after birth. This is not necessarily the case in Bali. Craniofacial disabilities are not only disfiguring, but can also lead to difficulties with nutrition and communication. As such, treatment is essential. However, treatment is not just expensive, but it can involve extensive travel from the individual's home environment as well a complex bureaucratic process.

This is exacerbated by a number of factors: many of the people requiring treatment are poor, often illiterate and they may not speak Indonesian. Thus not only do they have trouble paying for treatment (which may also involve accommodation and travel expenses), but when they arrive for treatment they have trouble completing admission forms and understanding the processes which need to be undertaken. In addition, many patients have not previously left their home villages, making the experience particularly difficult and traumatic, which is strengthened by the social isolation caused by their disabilities.

Activities 

The foundation provides pre- and post-operative support and helps to organise treatment for people suffering from craniofacial disabilities. Part of this involves identifying those in need, both in Bali and the surrounding Indonesian islands, as per David David's initial request. Once identified, the patients are sent either to the Sanglah General Hospital or the Dharma Husada Hospital in Denpasar, or, in the more serious cases, to the Australian Craniofacial Unit at the Women's and Children's Hospital in Adelaide, South Australia. This may involve organising visas, passports and flights for the patients. For patients being treated in Denpasar, the Smile House provides accommodation, as well as educational services to the parents — in particular as regards post-operative care.

Funding and operation 

Much of the funding comes from donations from both individuals and organisations. For example, the Australian Consulate General in Bali, working with the Smile Foundation, provided funding for seventy children to have craniofacial surgery in 2006. Charity events, such as Adam Gyorgy's piano performance in 2006, are also important to the foundation.
In November 2011, the Commonwealth Bank WTA tennis tournament in Bali will raise money for the charity auctioning works of art of participating artists such as Joël BLANC.

Additional funds are raised the Smile Shop, which sells secondhand goods, largely from expatriates, but also increasingly old stock from local shops and linen from hotels. The Smile Shop is staffed entirely by volunteers.

The foundation is run by three paid employees, based at their office in the Smile House. In addition, Mary Northmore-Aziz is the chairperson, with Dr. David David and Dr A. A. Asmarajaya listed as advisers. The board includes Dr A. A. Asmarajaya, Denise Finney, Eko Prabowo and Sarita Newson.

See also 

 Senang Hati Foundation

References

External links 
 Yayasan Senyum official website
 Smile Foundation ranked in Top ten NGO in 2013 by MaStyle Care : http://www.slideshare.net/mastylecare/top-ten-ngo-in-india-mastyle-care

Organizations based in Bali
Medical and health organizations based in Indonesia
Foundations based in Indonesia